The Socialist People's Party was a political party in Indonesia. It was founded in Djakarta in 1945. Sutan Sjahrir was the chairman of the party. In December 1945, at a meeting in Cheribon, the party merged with the Socialist Party of Indonesia, forming the Socialist Party with Sjahrir as chairman.

References

1945 disestablishments in Indonesia
1945 establishments in Indonesia
Defunct political parties in Indonesia
Defunct socialist parties in Asia
Political parties disestablished in 1945
Political parties established in 1945
Socialist parties in Indonesia